Sérgio Antonio De Luiz Junior (born 6 April 1995), commonly known as Serginho, is a Brazilian footballer who plays as a forward for Turkish club Giresunspor.

References

1995 births
Living people
Brazilian footballers
Brazilian expatriate footballers
KF Hajvalia players
Expatriate footballers in Kosovo
Expatriate footballers in Turkey
Brazilian expatriate sportspeople in Albania
Expatriate footballers in Albania
Association football forwards
Kategoria Superiore players
Giresunspor footballers
Association football midfielders
Macedonian First Football League players
Süper Lig players
TFF First League players
Footballers from Belo Horizonte